Below is the list of populated places in Düzce Province, Turkey by the districts. In the following lists, first place in each list is the administrative center of the district.

Düzce

 Düzce
 Akbıyıklar, Düzce
 Aktarla, Düzce	
 Akyazı, Düzce	
 Altınpınar, Düzce	
 Asar, Düzce	
 Aybaşı, Düzce	
 Aydınpınar, Düzce	
 Aynalı, Düzce	
 Bahçe, Düzce	
 Ballıca, Düzce	
 Bataklı Çiftlik, Düzce	
 Beyköy, Düzce	
 Boğaziçi, Düzce	
 Büyük Açma, Düzce	
 Çakırhacı İbrahim, Düzce	
 Çalıcuma, Düzce
 Çamlısu, Düzce	
 Çınardüzü, Düzce	
 Çınarlı, Düzce	
 Çiftlik, Düzce	
 Dağdibi, Düzce	
 Değirmenbaşı, Düzce	
 Derdin, Düzce	
 Develi, Düzce	
 Doğanlı, Düzce	
 Duraklar, Düzce	
 Düverdüzü, Düzce	
 Düz, Düzce	
 Eminaçma, Düzce	
 Erdemli, Düzce	
 Esençam, Düzce	
 Esentepe, Düzce	
 Eski Mengencik, Düzce	
 Fevziye, Düzce	
 Fındıklı Aksu, Düzce	
 Gökçe, Düzce	
 Gölormanı, Düzce	
 Güldere, Düzce	
 Gümüşpınar, Düzce	
 Günbaşı, Düzce	
 Gündolaması, Düzce	
 Güven, Düzce	
 Hacı Ahmetler, Düzce	
 Hacı Aliler, Düzce	
 Hasanlar, Düzce	
 Hatipli Ketenciler, Düzce	
 Hocaoğlu, Düzce	
 İhsaniye, Düzce	
 İslahiye, Düzce	
 İstilli, Düzce	
 Kabalak, Düzce	
 Kadıoğlu, Düzce	
 Kaledibi, Düzce	
 Karaçalı, Düzce	
 Karadere Hasanağa, Düzce	
 Kavakbıçkı, Düzce	
 Kaymakçı, Düzce	
 Kemerkasım, Düzce	
 Kızılcık, Düzce	
 Kirazlı, Düzce	
 Konaklı, Düzce	
 Konuralp, Düzce	
 Kozluk, Düzce	
 Köprübaşı, Düzce	
 Kurtsuyu, Düzce	
 Kuşaçması, Düzce	
 Kutlu, Düzce	
 Küçükahmet, Düzce	
 Küçükmehmet, Düzce	
 Mamure, Düzce	
 Muncurlu, Düzce	
 Muradiye Mengencik, Düzce	
 Musababa, Düzce	
 Nasırlı, Düzce	
 Nuhlar, Düzce	
 Osmanca, Düzce	
 Otluoğlu, Düzce	
 Ovapınar, Düzce	
 Ozanlar, Düzce	
 Özyanık, Düzce	
 Paşakonağı, Düzce	
 Paşaormanı, Düzce	
 Pınarlar, Düzce	
 Samandere, Düzce	
 Sancakdere, Düzce	
 Sinirci, Düzce	
 Soğukpınar, Düzce	
 Suncuk, Düzce	
 Şaziye, Düzce	
 Taşköprü, Düzce	
 Turaplar, Düzce	
 Uğur, Düzce	
 Üçyol, Düzce	
 Yaka, Düzce	
 Yayakbaşı, Düzce	
 Yayla, Düzce	
 Yeni Aynalı, Düzce	
 Yeni Karaköy, Düzce	
 Yeni Taşköprü, Düzce	
 Yeşilçam, Düzce	
 Yeşilçimen, Düzce	
 Yörük, Düzce

Akçakoca

 Akçakoca
 Akkaya, Akçakoca
 Yukarı Mahalle, Akçakoca
 Aktaş, Akçakoca	
 Altunçay, Akçakoca	
 Arabacı, Akçakoca	
 Balatlı, Akçakoca	
 Beyhanlı, Akçakoca	
 Beyören, Akçakoca	
 Çayağzı, Akçakoca	
 Çiçekpınar, Akçakoca	
 Dadalı, Akçakoca	
 Davutağa, Akçakoca	
 Deredibi, Akçakoca	
 Dereköy, Akçakoca	
 Dilaver, Akçakoca	
 Doğancılar, Akçakoca	
 Döngelli, Akçakoca	
 Edilli, Akçakoca	
 Esmahanım, Akçakoca	
 Fakıllı, Akçakoca	
 Göktepe, Akçakoca	
 Hasançavuş, Akçakoca	
 Hemşin, Akçakoca	
 Kalkın, Akçakoca	
 Karatavuk, Akçakoca	
 Kepenç, Akçakoca	
 Kınık, Akçakoca	
 Kirazlı, Akçakoca	
 Koçar, Akçakoca	
 Koçullu, Akçakoca	
 Kurugöl, Akçakoca	
 Kurukavak, Akçakoca	
 Küpler, Akçakoca	
 Melenağzı, Akçakoca	
 Nazımbey, Akçakoca	
 Ortanca, Akçakoca	
 Paşalar, Akçakoca	
 Sarıyayla, Akçakoca	
 Subaşı, Akçakoca	
 Tahirli, Akçakoca	
 Tepeköy, Akçakoca	
 Uğurlu, Akçakoca	
 Yenice, Akçakoca	
 Yeşilköy, Akçakoca

Cumayeri

 Cumayeri
 Akpınar, Cumayeri
 Avlayan, Cumayeri	
 Büyükmelen, Cumayeri	
 Çamlıpınar, Cumayeri	
 Çelikdere, Cumayeri	
 Dokuzdeğirmen, Cumayeri	
 Esentepe, Cumayeri	
 Hamascık, Cumayeri	
 Harmankaya, Cumayeri	
 Iğdır, Cumayeri	
 Kızılüzüm, Cumayeri	
 Mısırlık, Cumayeri	
 Ordulukaradere, Cumayeri	
 Ören, Cumayeri	
 Sırtpınar, Cumayeri	
 Subaşı, Cumayeri	
 Taşlık, Cumayeri	
 Üvezbeli, Cumayeri	
 Yenitepe, Cumayeri	
 Yeşiltepe, Cumayeri	
 Yukarıavlayan, Cumayeri

Çilimli

 Çilimli
  Alacamescit, Çilimli
  Bıçkıbaşı, Çilimli	
  Çalılık, Çilimli	
  Dikmeli, Çilimli	
  Döngelli, Çilimli	
  Esenli, Çilimli	
  Hızardere, Çilimli	
  İshaklar, Çilimli	
  Kafyayla, Çilimli	
  Karaçörtlen, Çilimli	
  Kırkharman, Çilimli	
  Kiraztarla, Çilimli	
  Kuşoğlu, Çilimli	
  Pırpır, Çilimli	
  Sarımeşe, Çilimli	
  Söğütlü, Çilimli	
  Tepeköy, Çilimli	
  Yeniköy, Çilimli	
  Yenivakıf, Çilimli	
  Yukarıkaraköy, Çilimli

Gölyaka

 Gölyaka
 Açma, Gölyaka
 Aksu, Gölyaka	
 Bakacak, Gölyaka	
 Çamlıbel, Gölyaka	
 Çay, Gölyaka	
 Değirmentepe, Gölyaka	
 Bekiroğlu, Gölyaka	
 Güzeldere, Gölyaka	
 Hacısüleymanbey, Gölyaka	
 Hacıyakup, Gölyaka	
 Hamamüstü, Gölyaka	
 İçmeler, Gölyaka	
 Kemeryanı, Gölyaka	
 Muhapdede, Gölyaka	
 Saçmalıpınar, Gölyaka	
 Sarıdere, Gölyaka	
 Taşlık, Gölyaka	
 Yazlık, Gölyaka	
 Yeşilova, Gölyaka	
 Yunusefendi, Gölyaka	
 Zekeriya, Gölyaka

Gümüşova

 Gümüşova
 Adaköy, Gümüşova
 Ardıçdibi, Gümüşova	
 Çaybükü, Gümüşova	
 Dededüzü, Gümüşova	
 Dereköy, Gümüşova	
 Elmacık, Gümüşova	
 Hacıkadirler, Gümüşova	
 Halilbey, Gümüşova	
 Kahveleryanı, Gümüşova	
 Kıyıköy, Gümüşova	
 Pazarcık, Gümüşova	
 Selamlar, Gümüşova	
 Soğuksu, Gümüşova	
 Sultaniye, Gümüşova	
 Yakabaşı, Gümüşova	
 Yeşilyayla, Gümüşova	
 Yıldıztepe, Gümüşova	
 Yongalık, Gümüşova

Kaynaşlı

 Kaynaşlı
 Altunköy, Kaynaşlı
 Bıçkıyanı, Kaynaşlı	
 Çakırsayvan, Kaynaşlı	
 Çamlıca, Kaynaşlı	
 Çamoluk, Kaynaşlı	
 Çatalçam, Kaynaşlı	
 Darıyeribakacak, Kaynaşlı	
 Darıyerihasanbey, Kaynaşlı	
 Darıyerimengencik, Kaynaşlı	
 Darıyeriyürükler, Kaynaşlı	
 Dipsizgöl, Kaynaşlı	
 Fındıklı, Kaynaşlı	
 Hacıazizler, Kaynaşlı	
 Muratbey, Kaynaşlı	
 Sarıçökek, Kaynaşlı	
 Sazköy, Kaynaşlı	
 Tavak, Kaynaşlı	
 Üçköprü, Kaynaşlı	
 Yeniyurt, Kaynaşlı	
 Yeşiltepe, Kaynaşlı

Yığılca

 Yığılca
 Akçaören, Yığılca
 Aksaklar, Yığılca	
 Asar, Yığılca	
 Aydınyayla, Yığılca	
 Bekirler, Yığılca	
 Çamlı, Yığılca	
 Çiftlik, Yığılca	
 Çukurören, Yığılca	
 Dibektaş, Yığılca	
 Doğanlar, Yığılca	
 Dutlar, Yığılca	
 Gaziler, Yığılca	
 Gelenöz, Yığılca	
 Geriş, Yığılca	
 Gökçeağaç, Yığılca	
 Güney, Yığılca	
 Hacılar, Yığılca	
 Hacıyeri, Yığılca	
 Hebeler, Yığılca	
 Hocaköy, Yığılca	
 Hocatman, Yığılca	
 Hoşafoğlu, Yığılca	
 İğneler, Yığılca	
 Karakaş, Yığılca	
 Kırık, Yığılca	
 Kocaoğlu, Yığılca	
 Köseler, Yığılca	
 Mengen, Yığılca	
 Naşlar, Yığılca	
 Orhangazi, Yığılca	
 Redifler, Yığılca	
 Sarıkaya, Yığılca	
 Tıraşlar, Yığılca	
 Tuğrul, Yığılca	
 Yağcılar, Yığılca	
 Yaylatepe, Yığılca	
 Yeniyer, Yığılca	
 Yılgın, Yığılca	
 Yoğunpelit, Yığılca

References

Duzce
List